MV Akademik Shokalskiy is an Akademik Shuleykin-class ice-strengthened ship, built in Finland in 1982 and originally used for oceanographic research. In 1998 she was fully refurbished to serve as a research ship for Arctic and Antarctic work; she is used also for expedition cruising. She is named after the Russian oceanographer Yuly Shokalsky.

For two weeks from 25 December 2013 Akademik Shokalskiy was trapped in thick ice in Commonwealth Bay, Antarctica, while operating an expedition for the Australasian Antarctic Expedition 2013–2014. The scientists and passengers were evacuated on 2 January.

Use as cruise ship 
The ship has two passenger decks, with dining rooms, a bar, a library, and a sauna, and accommodates 54 passengers. She is owned by the Russian Federation's Far Eastern Hydrometeorological Research Institute, Vladivostok and was previously chartered to Aurora Expeditions, an Australian expedition cruise line. It is currently operated by Chimu Adventures an Australian Tour operator departing from Hobart to East Antarctica. In 2011, Akademik Shokalskiy sailed cruises along the coast of Russia, including the Northeast Passage, and to East Antarctica.

Icebound in Antarctica
In 2013 Akademik Shokalskiy was chartered by the Australasian Antarctic Expedition 2013–2014 to celebrate the centenary of the previous expedition under Douglas Mawson, and to repeat his scientific observations. The expedition had nine scientific goals related to observations, mapping, and measurements of environmental, biological, and marine changes associated with climate change. On 8 December 2013 the ship, with 74 people on board — four journalists, 19 scientists, 26 tourists, the expedition leader's wife and two children, and 22 crew members — sailed from Bluff in New Zealand to Antarctica. Chinese icebreaking research vessel Xuě Lóng, French research vessel L'Astrolabe and Australian icebreaker Aurora Australis were dispatched by the Australian Maritime Safety Authority to assist with the rescue operation of Akademik Shokalskiy.

However it remained in open water nearby as it carried a helicopter, which ultimately was deployed later for the rescue operation. L'Astrolabe also turned back after encountering heavy ice.

On 2 January 2014, Akademik Shokalskiys 52 passengers were evacuated to Aurora Australis by Xuě Lóngs helicopter, which transferred them between temporary ice helipads alongside each vessel. The original plan was to helicopter the passengers to Xuě Lóng, then transfer them to Aurora Australis by boat, but the Chinese icebreaker had become trapped by ice. After the rescue, Aurora Australis continued on her original mission to resupply Casey Station, before returning to Hobart on 22 January. The 22 Akademik Shokalskiy crew were required by their employment contracts to stay aboard until the ship could be freed.

On 4 January 2014, the American heavy icebreaker Polar Star was dispatched from Sydney, Australia to assist Akademik Shokalskiy and Xuě Lóng at the request of Australian authorities. However, on 8 January the Australian Maritime Safety Authority confirmed that both vessels had broken free and were proceeding to open water, and later the same day Polar Star was released to scheduled duties. On 14 January Akademik Shokalskiy returned to the port of Bluff.

Environmental writer Andrew Revkin criticized the scientists on board Akademik Shokalskiy, stating that "important and costly field research in Antarctica has been seriously disrupted" by an "unessential" mission. He also commended an article by Professor Michael Robinson of University of Hartford, which noted that the expedition aimed to use Mawson's observations as a baseline for their own scientific findings "that will illuminate Antarctica's future, not its past. As such, the voyage will prove to be well worth the time and effort."

References

Notes

External links

Aurora Expeditions: Akademik Shokalskiy
Shipspotting: IMO 8010336

Ships built in Turku
Expedition cruising
Akademik Shuleykin-class oceanographic research vessels
1982 ships